Tadhgie Lyne ( 8 December 1930 – 31 May 2000) was an Irish Gaelic footballer with Kerry.  Called 'the Prince of Forwards', Lyne was one of the finest scoring forwards of his time.

Early life
Tadhgie Lyne grew up on High Street, Killarney, only half a mile from the famous Kerry ground of Fitzgerald Stadium.  His football talent apparent from an early age, and he spent hours daily practicing the skills of the game with a ball suspended from the rafters of his father's house.  Nevertheless, despite being called for trials for the Kerry All-Ireland Minor Football Championship for two years in succession he could not make the panel, with contemporaries such as Jerome O'Shea and Seán Murphy outshining him.

Playing career
Lyne's county career only began after his club, the Dick Fitzgeralds, won the 1951 Kerry Senior Football Championship.  Lyne kicked 1–5 from right-half forward in the final against Dingle.  He became a fixture in the Kerry team for a decade.  In 1953, Lyne played at wing-forward on the Kerry team that won the Munster Senior Football Championship and went on to play in his first All-Ireland Senior Football Championship final, giving a man-of-the-match display with six points as Kerry beat Armagh 0–13 to 1–6.

Kerry won Munster and reached the All-Ireland final again in 1954, but Meath beat them by 1–13 to 1–7.  In 1955, Lyne might have been lost to football, but he turned down the offer of a professional soccer contract with Glasgow Celtic to play with Kerry.  Kerry was Munster champions for the third consecutive time that year.  They progressed to face Cavan in the All-Ireland semi final.  Lyne scored 1–6 and punched a goal in the last moments to earn Kerry a draw.  They went on to win the replay and faced Dublin.  Lyne kicked a fine point in the first minute and notched five more as Kerry won by 0–12 to 1–9.  The game is remembered as "Tadhgie Lyne's All-Ireland".  He was the championship's top marksman that year with five goals and forty-two points and was named Footballer of the Year.

Lyne won another Munster senior medal in 1958 when he came on as a replacement in the final.  However, Kerry was beaten in the All-Ireland semi-final.  The 'Prince of Forwards' gained his third and final All-Ireland in 1959.  Kerry won the Munster championship and went on to qualify for the All-Ireland final, in which they beat Galway by nine points.

Later life
Tadhg Lyne died at his home on Killarney Road, Castleisland on 31 May 2000 at the age of 69.

References

External links
http://archives.tcm.ie/roscommonherald/2006/03/01/story3145.asp
http://www.terracetalkireland.com/weeshie_week/article_march_12005.htm
http://www.terracetalkireland.com/articles/text/lynes.doc

 

1930s births
2000 deaths
Dr Crokes Gaelic footballers
Gaelic football forwards
Kerry inter-county Gaelic footballers